Thomas Green (14 July 1873 – 4 October 1921) was an English footballer who played as an inside forward. He attended Vicarage Road School in Birmingham and joined Coles Farm Unity in 1892. He signed for West Bromwich Albion in May 1894 and made his debut against Small Heath in February 1895. After scoring two goals in eight appearances for Albion (all in the league), Green moved to Small Heath in June 1896. He also played for Oldbury Town between May 1902 and May 1906. Green later became a licensee and died in Worcester on 4 October 1921.

References

1873 births
1921 deaths
Footballers from Birmingham, West Midlands
English footballers
Association football inside forwards
West Bromwich Albion F.C. players
Birmingham City F.C. players
Oldbury Town F.C. players
English Football League players